The 1927 Penn Quakers football team was an American football team that represented the University of Pennsylvania as an independent during the 1927 college football season. In their fifth season under head coach Lou Young, the Quakers compiled a 6–4 record, shut out five of ten opponents, and outscored all opponents by a total of 167 to 78. The team played its home games at Franklin Field in Philadelphia.

Schedule

References

Penn
Penn Quakers football seasons
Penn Quakers football